Lítačka is a municipal smart card system in Prague, Czech Republic. Introduced in 2016, the card serves as an electronic ticket for all services of the Prague Integrated Transport system (metro, trams, buses, funiculars and ferries). It also serves as a replacement of a library card for the Municipal Library and the National Library of Technology and have benefits for various discounts.

The card name was previously used for a travel ticket originated in the slang of Eastern Bohemia. The name was chosen by the outcome of social networks analysis, commissioned by the municipality to develop. In a survey that Praha has commissioned, 52.56 % of people choose the name "Lítačka".

In early 2016, electronic card Lítačka started to be issued as a replacement for Opencard, which has been a major national controversy since its introduction in 2008. Compared with Opencard, for magistrate fell off payments for system maintenance and payments for each issued card. Opencard is not being issued since 2016 and its validity definitively ended in February 2020.

The contactless card is intended for both residents and visitors of Prague.

References

External links 
Official website 

Fare collection systems in the Czech Republic
Contactless smart cards
Public transport in Prague
2016 introductions